Robert Ardito is an Australian martial artist. He is a former Guinness World Records holder for the Most Full Contact Punches In One Minute.

Martial Arts Career 
Ardito studied traditional Wing Chun as a student of Sifu Jim Fung.

World Record 
In 2005, Ardito broke the record for the first time with 428 punches. In 2007, he later surpassed his previous record with 702 punches. In 2009, the record was broken for the last time by Ardito, totalling 805 punches.

In 2017, the record was broken by Norman Breese from the United States, with a total of 901 punches, where the record currently stands as of January 2022.

Innovation Patent 
In 2015, Ardito was granted an Innovation Patent by IP Australia upon Evolved Wing Chun. It is recognised as substantially contributing to the martial art of Wing Chun.

Notes

References

External links 

 International Wing Chun Academy 
 Ardito Defence Academy

Living people
Year of birth missing (living people)